David Ross MacDonald (born January 27, 1965) is a Canadian sailor. Born in Vancouver, British Columbia, Canada, he began sailing at the age of 11. MacDonald won a silver medal with Mike Wolfs at the 2004 Summer Olympics in the men's Star event, and a bronze with Eric Jespersen at the 1992 Summer Olympics in the same event.

MacDonald also sailed the 1997–98 Whitbread Round the World Race on Toshiba.

References
 

1965 births
Living people
Canadian male sailors (sport)
Canadian people of Scottish descent
Olympic sailors of Canada
Sportspeople from Vancouver
Sailors at the 1988 Summer Olympics – Star
Sailors at the 1992 Summer Olympics – Star
Sailors at the 1996 Summer Olympics – Star
Sailors at the 2000 Summer Olympics – Star
Sailors at the 2004 Summer Olympics – Star
Olympic silver medalists for Canada
Olympic bronze medalists for Canada
Olympic medalists in sailing
Star class world champions
Medalists at the 2004 Summer Olympics
Medalists at the 1992 Summer Olympics
Volvo Ocean Race sailors
World champions in sailing for Canada